Accelerated Learning Framework (ALF) is an education model. It focuses on three key change drivers.  ALF "provides a conceptual link between a digitally rich learning-without-limits environment, and student achievement".

Change drivers 
The first change driver places pedagogy and the moral imperative in the role of driver. The second is the establishment of technology as a non-threatening element of learning. The third is the creation of the means for students and teachers to learn from one another. The idea of this structure is to minimize judgement so that people can learn.

History 
The framework was created at Park Manor School in Elmira, Ontario, Canada, part of the Waterloo Region District School Board, by lead framework developer, Liz Anderson, who was a Grade 6 teacher at the time.

This framework was first released at the Educational Computing Organization of Ontario 2011 conference in Thornhill, Ontario on October 21st, 2011, Anderson (Language Arts Teacher, Park Manor School, WRDSB), James Bond (Principal of Park Manor School, WRDSB) and Melanie Jespersen (French Immersion Teacher, Park Manor School, WRDSB), presented PlayBooks – Digitally Rich Learning Without Limits.

The framework appeared in multiple books by Canadian educational researcher, Michael Fullan, including the 2012 book Stratosphere: Integrating Technology, Pedagogy, and Change Knowledge.

References

External links
Videos about Accelerated Learning Framework:

 Accelerated Learning Framework Explained - Liz Anderson
 Topic Series: Focus - Michael Fullan
 Our Journey To Awesome (Park Manor School) - Michael Fullan
 Park Manor - CollaborativeImpact

Pedagogy
Learning